is a Japanese boy band produced by Johnnys' Island Company, a division of Tokyo-based talent agency Johnny & Associates. They were created on February 26, 2018, by Johnny Kitagawa, and named after Akira Kurosawa's 1954 film Seven Samurai. They are known for their dance acumen, band-style performances, and rock covers/remixes of J-Pop songs from the older Johnnys' talent catalog, including Cinderella Girl (original artist: King & Prince), and SAMURAI (original artist: Takky & Tsubasa).

In addition to appearing regularly as a group in the bi-monthly music and variety show The Shonen Club (NHK), they are one of eight groups featured on the official Johnnys' Junior YouTube Channel, and have posted content every Friday since August 2019. They are also active on the Johnnys' official video site Island TV, where they share vlog-style behind-the-scenes recaps of work and engagements, as well as humorous vignettes, outtakes and original skits.

Various members are also featured regulars and guest stars on Japanese variety TV programs; such as the quiz show Torinikutte Nan no Nikui!? (TV Asahi) and the sports competition series Honoo no Taiikutai TV (TBS) for which member Rinne Sugeta is an official part of the in-show "Johnny's Track-and-Field Team" coached by KAT-TUN's Tatsuya Ueda. Individual members have also been cast in starring and supporting roles for stage and in scripted television dramas.

Members

Music 

On May 1, 2020, it was announced that they would be receiving their first original song from Johnnys' Island CEO Hideaki Takizawa during a surprise prank video uploaded as one of their YouTube contents. The song had been intended for their solo segment during the annual Johnnys' Ginza spring talent showcase, all of which was cancelled due to the Covid-19 pandemic.

The song, called "Samu-dama" (サムダマ), was finally performed in August 2020, during a 2 day/5 show solo segment the group hosted as part of the larger Summer Paradise 2020 livestreamed music festival from Johnny & Associates for the website Johnny's Net Online (JNO). The song is a hard rock number with the title being a portmanteau of the Japanese words for "samurai spirit," or samurai damashii (侍魂). On September 11, 2020, a self-shot Studio Live music video for SAMU-DAMA was uploaded to the Johnnys' Junior YouTube channel, along with a separate making-of vignette and an encore performance covering Tokio's 2000 up-tempo rock song "Jumbo".

A second original song, "Siren" (サイレン) was debuted on November 28, 2020, as part of the boys' solo set within the Johnnys' Jr. Island FES music festival, performed alongside additional original songs for fellow Johnnys' Junior performers HiHi Jets and Jr.SP. A third, "SHOUT," premiered during the JOHNNYS' IsLAND THE NEW WORLD new year showcase in January 2022.

Live Concerts

References 

Japanese pop music groups
Japanese idol groups
Japanese boy bands
Japanese dance groups
Johnny & Associates
Musical groups established in 2018
Musical groups from Tokyo
2018 establishments in Japan